Wallace Clifton Fessenden (October 5, 1860 – May 16, 1935) was a 19th-century Major League Baseball manager with the Syracuse Stars in 1890 of the  American Association. He briefly managed the Stars to a record of 4–7, while filling in for George Frazier. He also briefly was a player/manager for the Lynn team in the Massachusetts State Association in 1884 and the Manager for Salem of the New England League in 1888.

Fessenden also umpired in the National League in 1889 and 1890. He umpired 53 games total.

External links
Baseball-Reference page
Retrosheet

1860 births
1935 deaths
Major League Baseball managers
Minor league baseball managers
Burials at Green-Wood Cemetery
Lynn (minor league baseball) players
Major League Baseball umpires
19th-century baseball umpires
Baseball players from Syracuse, New York